Wildcat Mountain is a summit in Iron County, Missouri, located  west of Taum Sauk Mountain, Missouri's highest peak.  Wildcat Mountain's summit elevation is only about two feet less than that of Taum Sauk Mountain.

Wildcat Mountain was named for the wildcats in the area.

Notes 

Mountains of Iron County, Missouri
Mountains of Missouri